Cosmic Eye is a short 2012 film and iOS app, developed by astrophysicist Danail Obreschkow. It shows the largest and smallest well known scales of the universe by gradually zooming out from and then back into the face of a woman called "Louise". According to the developer, the film and app were inspired by the essay Cosmic View (1957) and the short films Cosmic Zoom (1968) and Powers of Ten (1977), but uses state-of-the-art technology and new scientific imaging and computer simulations. Cosmic Eye, although developed in 2012 for local teaching and outreach purposes, in April 2016 it suddenly attracted 40 million views in just ten days on the Facebook group page of "The Science Scoop". The video has since been viewed more than 200 million times on Facebook and was featured in major media, such as BBC World News.

Cosmic Eye was re-released in 2018 in high-resolution landscape (16:9) format and slightly improved graphics that include animated vector elements.

The woman at the centre of the film is Louise McKay, a professional cellist from Western Australia.

See also
 Cosmic Voyage, 1996 film

References

2012 short films
2012 films
IOS software